Force Touch is a haptic technology developed by Apple Inc. that enables trackpads and touchscreens to distinguish between various levels of force being applied to their surfaces. It uses pressure sensors to add another method of input to Apple's devices. The technology was first unveiled on September 9, 2014, during the introduction of Apple Watch. Starting with the Apple Watch, Force Touch has been incorporated into many products within Apple's lineup. This notably includes MacBooks and the Magic Trackpad 2. The technology is known as 3D Touch on the iPhone models. The technology brings usability enhancements to the software by offering a third dimension to accept input. Accessing shortcuts, previewing details, drawing art and system wide features enable users to additionally interact with the displayed content by applying force on the input surface.

3D Touch has three levels of input based on the pressure sensitivity. This enables users to customize a preference of light, medium, or firm press on the iPhone's screen. Force Touch on the other hand, has two layers of interaction. Apple's haptic engine called the Taptic Engine resides in these devices, which houses a linear actuator producing vibratory effects as feedback. Apple allows application developers to leverage the pressure sensitivity of trackpads and touchscreens into their own apps. 3D Touch was discontinued with the iPhone 11 and onwards in favor of Haptic Touch.

Haptic Touch is a feature on the iPhone XR (but not the iPhone XS) and later iPhone models replacing 3D Touch. The touchscreen, which no longer has a pressure sensitive layer, distinguishes between a tap and a long-press using a timed delay to activate certain 3D Touch features (only ones for elements that do not have an action assigned to long press). This feature was added to the iPhone SE (1st generation) with the iOS 13 update and to any iPad capable of running iPadOS 13. As of watchOS 7, only Haptic Touch is recognized, and Force Touch is discontinued on all subsequent Apple Watches.

User functionality
Force Touch on Macs bring a variety of features. A few notable ones are:

 Look up text to show more information from Dictionary, Wikipedia, etc.
 Show an Apple Maps preview of an address location.
 Add dates and events to Calendar.
 Preview details of flight numbers, tracking numbers and events.
 Accelerate fast-forwarding and rewinding on QuickTime and iMovie using variable pressure.

3D Touch on iPhones bring the following features, but are not limited to:

 Quick Actions allow users to access shortcuts, many right from the Home screen.
 Peek and Pop allows users to preview content and take actions on it, without having to open it. Pressing further, the user can pop into the content in the app.
 Pressure Sensitivity allows creative apps to take advantage of the pressure-sensing display, for varying line thickness or giving a brush a changing style.
 Holding down to: preview Live Photos; open the App Switcher (iPhone 6s, 6s Plus, 7, 7 Plus, 8, and 8 Plus only); etc.
 Pressing down on the keyboard displays a cursor which can be moved in two dimensions. Pressing again enters selection mode.

Force Touch on Apple Watch brings some significant features, such as:

 See alternate watch faces from the current watch face.
 Get the analog, digital, graph, and hybrid modes on the stopwatch app.
 Toggle between day, list, or today view on the calendar app.
 See weather, rain predictions and temperature on the weather app.

Software
Apple allows application developers to integrate the force touch functionality into their applications. The APIs facilitate the following interactions:

 Apps respond to a press of stronger pressure, providing a shortcut as an additional functionality.
 Pressure sensitivity for drawing and creative apps to make lines thicker or give brushes a changing style.
 Accelerators allow receiving pressure sensitivity, to give users greater control. Say, fast-forward in media playback can speed up as pressure increases.
 Drag and drop to allow users react to a force gesture amidst the hold, to immediately open a new target for the drop.

Hardware

On iPhones with 3D Touch, the capacitive sensors are directly integrated into the display. When a press is detected, these capacitive sensors measure microscopic changes in the distance between the back light and the cover glass. On the Apple Watch, a series of electrodes line the curvature of the screen. When a press is detected, these electrodes determine the pressure applied. The trackpads deploy a similar mechanism, although sensory information is determined by a series of four sensors that align with the corners of the trackpad. The detected pressure is then relayed to the Taptic Engine, which is Apple's haptic feedback engine. The electromagnetic linear actuator within the Taptic engine is capable of reaching its peak output in just one cycle and producing vibrations that last 10 milliseconds. Unlike typical motors, the linear actuator does not rotate but oscillates back and forth. The Taptic Engine produces immediate haptic feedback, without the need to offset the balance of mass. The haptic feedback produced may be accompanied by an audible tone. This helps in gaining the user's attention in order to convey an important information such as a success, warning or a failure. Each haptic type is defined for a specific purpose, to convey a specific meaning.

Mechanics

The touch sensitive interface could either be a trackpad or a touch screen. Multiple actuators are mechanically connected to the back of the input surface. The actuators are distributed along the surface, each at a separate contact location, to provide localized haptic feedback to the user. Piezoelectricity is used by actuators to convert the physically-induced vibration or the input displacement into an electrical signal. A controller is configured to activate the actuators in and around the point of contact. The actuators at the point of contact induces waveforms to produce vibration. However, since there are multiple actuators around the point of contact, the vibration can propagate to other locations, thus limiting the localization effect. This is why a second set of actuators induce waveforms to suppress the vibratory cross-talk produced by the first set of actuators. This may be achieved by producing waveforms that provides interference in terms of amplitude, frequency or both. The masking waveforms could also alter the vibration at contact locations by providing a user experience other than just suppressing the propagated vibrations.

Products
Force Touch or Haptic Touch technology is featured on the following Apple devices:

3D Touch technology was featured on the following Apple devices:

Litigation

Apple Inc. was subjected to a lawsuit by Immersion Corporation on February 11, 2016, due to allegations of infringing patents owned by Immersion on 3D Touch technology. According to the complaint, the asserted patents generally related to the apparatus and methods used in the implementation of pressure-enabled haptics to enhance the user experience on electronic devices. The violated patents with their corresponding description are as follows:

 U.S. Patent Nos. 8,619,051: Relates to a haptic feedback system including a controller, an associated memory, actuator drive and the drive's circuit. The memory stores at least one haptic effect that is executed by the controller.
 U.S. Patent Nos. 8,773,356: Relates to systems and methods for providing tactile sensations which are disclosed, such as the steps of outputting a display signal configured to preview a graphical object on a touch-sensitive input device.
 U.S. Patent Nos. 8,659,571: Relates to a system that produces a dynamic haptic effect and generates a drive signal that includes a gesture signal and a real or virtual device sensor signal.

In May 2018, a second lawsuit in the same District of Delaware court made the claim that Apple had knowingly infringed on four patents in the iPhone 6s and models of the MacBook and MacBook Pro lines. In June, the United States International Trade Commission confirmed it would launch an investigation into Immersion's claims. The violated patents from the second lawsuit, with their corresponding description are as follows:

 U.S. Patent Nos. 8,749,507: Relates to systems and methods in which the mobile electronic device determines a pressure and a change in pressure based on contact data.
 U.S. Patent Nos. 7,808,488: Relates to systems and methods for generating an actuator signal to output a haptic effect based on the user's interaction with a graphical object on a touchscreen.
 U.S. Patent Nos. 7,336,260: Relates to systems in which the electronic device detects different levels of pressure on the device and providing a tactile sensation in response.
 U.S. Patent Nos. 8,581,710: Relates to systems and methods for generating an actuator signal to output a haptic effect indicating whether the user's input is recognised or unrecognised and that a corresponding command was or was not found.

On January 29, 2018, Immersion released a brief statement confirming that the company had reached global settlement and license agreements with Apple, the terms of which would be kept confidential.

Similar technologies
A version of Force Touch was once in development by Nokia in a project called 'Goldfinger' from 2013, which would have been a Lumia smartphone. It was built for users to interact with the phone by merely hovering their hands over it, unlike the Force Touch present in Apple's ecosystem. Later renamed to Nokia Lumia McLaren and under development by Microsoft Mobile, the device was eventually cancelled in July 2014.

Phones such as the ZTE Axon mini, Meizu Pro 6, Huawei Mate S, and the Huawei P9 Plus also feature a pressure sensitive display, and the Google Pixel 4 features a software-based technology called Firm Press, which tries to guess the force of pressure using machine learning.

The application programming interface of Android OS added support for pressure-sensitive touching in 2009 with Android 2.0 Éclair, even though no according hardware existed at that time.

See also
 MacBook
 iPhone
 Apple Watch
 Haptic technology

References

External links
Official links:
 Force Touch - macOS
 3D Touch - iOS

Guides:
 Science behind Force Touch and Taptic Engine
 Force Touch guide - macOS
 3D Touch guide - iOS
 Force Touch guide - Apple Watch

Consumer electronics
Apple Inc. hardware